Lomatium marginatum is a species of flowering plant in the carrot family known by the common name butte desertparsley. It is endemic to California, where it is known from mountains, valley, and grassland habitat, including serpentine, in the northern half of the state. It is a perennial herb growing up to about half a meter tall from a small taproot. There is no stem, and the leaves and inflorescence emerge from ground level. The purple-green leaves may approach 30 centimeters long, their blades divided into many long, narrow segments. The short but wide inflorescence bears an umbel of yellowish, purplish, or reddish flowers. The Lomatium marginatum is not currently an endangered species.

External links
Calflora Database: Lomatium marginatum (Butte desertparsley,  Hartweg's lomatium, Tall hog fennel)
Calflora Database: Lomatium marginatum var. marginatum
Calflora Database: Lomatium marginatum var. purpureum (Jepson's lomatium)
Jepson Manual eFlora treatment of Lomatium marginatum
USDA Plants Profile for Lomatium marginatum (butte desertparsley)

UC CalPhotos gallery

marginatum
Endemic flora of California
Flora of the Klamath Mountains
Flora of the Sierra Nevada (United States)
Natural history of the California chaparral and woodlands
Natural history of the California Coast Ranges
Taxa named by George Bentham
Taxa named by John Merle Coulter
Taxa named by Willis Linn Jepson
Flora without expected TNC conservation status